Karine Thomas (born January 14, 1989) was a Canadian synchronized swimmer.

Her parents were on the national water-polo team. Her grandmother, Esther Blais-Valin, was a synchronized swimmer in the 1940s and 50s.

Career
Thomas began synchronized swimming at age ten, at thirteen she moved to Montreal to further her training. She joined the national team in 2007 and competed in her first world championships that year. Thomas was a two time Olympian competing in the women's team event at the 2012 Olympic Games, finishing fourth, and in the duet event at the 2016 Olympics, finishing seventh. Thomas won two golds at the 2015 Pan American Games, one in the team event and one with her partner Jacqueline Simoneau in the duet. In May 2017 Thomas retired from synchronized swimming, after being on the Canadian national team for ten years.

References 

1989 births
Living people
Canadian synchronized swimmers
Olympic synchronized swimmers of Canada
Pan American Games gold medalists for Canada
Pan American Games medalists in synchronized swimming
Sportspeople from Gatineau
Synchronized swimmers at the 2012 Summer Olympics
Synchronized swimmers at the 2015 Pan American Games
Synchronized swimmers at the 2015 World Aquatics Championships
Synchronized swimmers at the 2013 World Aquatics Championships
Synchronized swimmers at the 2011 World Aquatics Championships
Synchronized swimmers at the 2009 World Aquatics Championships
Synchronized swimmers at the 2007 World Aquatics Championships
Synchronized swimmers at the 2011 Pan American Games
Synchronized swimmers at the 2016 Summer Olympics
World Aquatics Championships medalists in synchronised swimming
Medalists at the 2011 Pan American Games
Medalists at the 2015 Pan American Games